VanLeer Polk (a.k.a. Van Leer Polk) (July 9, 1856 - December 19, 1907) was an American politician and diplomat from Tennessee. He served in the Tennessee Senate as a representative for Maury County in the 1890s.  He was appointed Consul-General in Calcutta, India, and was one of six representatives of the United States at the 1906 Pan-American Conference. He was a member of the influential Van Leer family.

Early life
Polk was born at Ashwood Hall in Ashwood, Tennessee on July 9, 1856. He attended the Silling's School in Vevey, Switzerland and in Rugby, England. His father, Andrew Jackson Polk, was the son of Colonel William Polk. His mother, Rebecca Van Leer, was an heiress from the Van Leer family to an iron fortune from Cumberland Furnace.

Career
Polk was a member of the Democratic Party and represented Maury County in the Tennessee Senate during the 1890s. With Flourney Rivers, a state senator for Giles County, he introduced railroad commission bills.

Polk invested in silver mining operations in Mexico along with Tennessee politicians Duncan Brown Cooper and Henry Cooper.

In 1883, a committee of the Tennessee State Senate discovered a $400,000 deficit in their accounting with funds being misappropriated by Polk's cousin, M.T. Polk. Polk and his cousin were apprehended by detectives in San Antonio, Texas but were released possibly due to the acceptance of a bribe and headed for Mexico. U.S. Marshals arrested Polk's cousin 18 miles from the Mexico border and he was returned to Tennessee and found guilty of embezzlement.

Polk was appointed as Consul-General to Calcutta, India by President Grover Cleveland. In 1906, he was appointed as one of six United States commissioners to the Pan-American Conference in Rio de Janeiro, Brazil by President Theodore Roosevelt.

He worked as editor of the Weekly News and Scimitar newspaper in Memphis, Tennessee.

Personal life
He married Dorothy Kitchen Bodine in New York City on February 20, 1907. He died on December 19, 1907 in Memphis, Tennessee.

References

1856 births
1907 deaths
19th-century American politicians
20th-century American newspaper editors
American diplomats
People from Maury County, Tennessee
Polk family
Democratic Party Tennessee state senators
Van Leer family